Limimaricola soesokkakensis is a Gram-negative, aerobic and rod-shaped bacterium from the genus of Limimaricola.

References 

Rhodobacteraceae
Bacteria described in 2014